Phil Dollman (born 15 May 1985) is a Welsh rugby union player. Dollman was a highly versatile player who could cover multiple positions in the backline, However he was mostly used at Exeter as a center or fullback. Dollman signed for Exeter Chiefs in May 2009 from Dragons. He started the final and scored a try as Exeter Chiefs defeated Wasps to be crowned champions of the 2016-17 English Premiership. He intends retiring at the conclusion of the 2019–20 season.

International
In May 2017 at the age of 32 he was named in the Wales senior squad for the tests against Tonga and Samoa in June 2017, following an injury to Rhun Williams. In that year's Premiership final Dollman himself suffered an injury in turn however and did not make an appearance for his country that summer.

References

External links
Aviva Premiership Player Profile
Exeter Chiefs profile

1985 births
Living people
Dragons RFC players
Exeter Chiefs players
Rugby union players from Caerphilly
Welsh rugby union players
Rugby union centres